Budziszki  is a village in the administrative district of Gmina Stary Lubotyń, within Ostrów Mazowiecka County, Masovian Voivodeship, in east-central Poland.

The village has a population of 126.

References

Budziszki